Jean Fabre (born Rodez, 7 November 1935) is a former French rugby union player. He played as a flanker.

He played for Stade Toulousain. He earned his first cap with the French national team on 11 November 1962 against Romania at Bucharest. In 1964 he became captain of French national team. After his player career he became president of Stade Toulousain during the 1980s.

External links 
  ESPN player profile

Living people
French rugby union players
France international rugby union players
Stade Toulousain players
People from Rodez
1935 births
Rugby union flankers
Sportspeople from Aveyron